Lương Sơn is a rural district of Hòa Bình province in the Northwest region of Vietnam, around 40 km from Hanoi. As of 2019, the district had a population of 99,457, with Muong people accounting for about 70% of the population. The district covers an area of 369.85 km2. The district capital lies at Lương Sơn.

Administrative divisions
Lương Sơn is divided into 11 commune-level sub-divisions, including the township of Lương Sơn and 10 rural communes (Cao Dương, Cao Sơn, Cư Yên, Hòa Sơn, Lâm Sơn, Liên Sơn, Nhuận Trạch, Tân Vinh, Thanh Cao, Thanh Sơn).

References

Districts of Hòa Bình province
Hòa Bình province